Stange or Stangebyen is the administrative centre of Stange Municipality in Innlandet county, Norway. The European route E6 highway runs along the east side of the village.

References

Stange
Villages in Innlandet